Samuel Heinrich Froehlich (1803–1857) was an Anabaptist evangelist responsible for organizing the Evangelical Baptist Church in Western Europe, which eventually spread to become known as the Nazarenes of Eastern Europe and the Apostolic Christian Church in the United States of America, Mexico, Argentina and Canada. Froehlich, a young seminary student in Switzerland, experienced a dramatic conversion, causing him to come into conflict with the state-church. He was excommunicated in the aftermath of his refusal to submit to an order that required the Heidelberg Catechism to be replaced by a new rationalistic catechism. He had sympathies with the Mennonite faith, but soon became convinced they were in a lukewarm state. Some of the Reformed and Mennonite persuasions followed Froehlich and were soon known as "Neu-Taufer". They later adopted the official name of Evangelical Baptist Church.

During this time he became affiliated with Anabaptist workers, such as Mennonites. He was re-baptized in February, 1832, as an adult. Through preaching in private meetings, new churches were planted. The work continued and in thirty-five years an estimated 110 congregations were established.

As a former minister in the Reformed Church, Froehlich became deeply influenced by the Anabaptists (who were known as the radical reformers in sixteenth century Europe). He embraced the following Anabaptist teachings:

Sola Scriptura - Scripture alone is the sole rule of faith and practical living.
Separation of Church and State
Believers' Baptism - adult baptism as opposed to infant baptism.
Holiness of Life
Nonviolence - Opposed killing another human, even in self-defense

Froehlich sent Benedict Weyeneth (1819–1887) to America at the request of Joseph Virkler, thus encouraging the foundation of the Anabaptist denomination in the United States known as the Apostolic Christian Church. The church spread as Nazarénusok (Nazarener-Gemeinde) in Hungary through the work of a young locksmith Lajos Hencsey (1814–1844) and 1,000 members survive today in Romania.

Education
Beginning in 1821, Froehlich studied theology at the Carolinum in Zürich, and then in 1823 transferred to the University of Basel. At this time German and Swiss universities were on the leading edge of historical Biblical criticism and Froehlich's instructors were among the most well known of their day. In his studies Froehlich excelled beyond many of his peers under the direction of Johannes Schulthess and Wilhelm Martin Leberecht de Wette. In particular, De Wette was known as a leader in the field of Biblical critique and spent nine years (1810-1819) working with Friedrich Schleiermacher, the father of modern Liberal Christianity, at the Friedrich Wilhelm University in Berlin.

Higher criticism, as it was called then, is the method of Biblical studies which seeks to demystify the texts of the Bible by reading them primarily as historical artifacts of human rather than divine origin. It examines the cultural and historic environment surrounding a text to find the author's original intent apart from any external concerns added by later interpretations. By the end of the 19th century this method had become the de facto standard of Biblical interpretation throughout German speaking academia.

Eventually Froehlich's use of historical critique served as the grounds for his rejection of conventional Protestantism. However, it also became the tool by which he developed a vision of primitive Christianity stripped free of the human innovations which had been added over the centuries. In this regard he shares significant common ground with other post-Enlightenment dissidents who were to emerge later from the same academic culture. In the early 20th century German Christian communist Eberhard Arnold and Swiss theologian Karl Barth followed a similar course. As with Froehlich they likewise came into conflict with both liberal and conservative streams of German Protestantism and were forced out of Germany at the onset of World War II. In a certain sense Froehlich and these others were simply continuing the original project of the Reformation which was to critically reexamine everything held sacred by the ecclesiastical establishment.

By 1825, Froehlich had become disillusioned with his studies, began to doubt his future direction and returned home because of economic constraints. This period marked the beginning of his spiritual awakening.
	
Once home, he preached in various area churches on a trial basis while awaiting his final examination for the ministry; a Latin dissertation on the theme: “De Verbo Dei tamquam Medio Gratiae” and a trial sermon on John 7:16-17 (My doctrine is not mine, but his that sent me). The initial examination did not go well as Froehlich himself reports, "The principles which I brought to light in these two compositions made such an unfavorable impression upon the members of the church council that I failed in the examination and was put back a year". After a further examination, on May 27, 1827, Froehlich was confirmed for the ministry in the Protestant state church. He became parish administrator for the congregation of Leutwil in canton Aargau and then in December 1828, he accepted a call as vicar to the same congregation. His strong preaching began somewhat of a revival in the area and drew visitors from surrounding parishes to the disdain of other clergy. On September 27, 1830, he was brought before a church council to examine his doctrine and his refusal to teach from the new catechism, a replacement of the older Heidelberg catechism. After deliberation, the council released him without coming to a decision. On October 22, 1830, he was formally removed from his office and on June 4, 1831, he was banned from all ecclesiastical service by the district magistrate of Brugg.

Theology
While one can find a degree of Reformed Protestant influence in Froehlich's writings, particularly earlier on, it quickly becomes apparent that he reflects a profoundly different viewpoint. He made no attempt to harmonize his thinking to any existing systematic theology neither did he try to assemble a comprehensive system of his own. Frequently he denied many of the central tenets common to all Protestant traditions including Reformed, Lutheranism, Calvinism and Arminianism. While speaking on Original Sin he denied mankind's inheritance of any legal condemnation from Adam and describes its effect as primarily one of human brokenness. On the Atonement of Christ, he occasionally uses the language of Penal Substitution but ultimately denies nearly all of the theological implications that Protestants derive from it. Where Reformers like Martin Luther placed a tremendous emphasis on the belief in a forensic understanding of Justification by faith Froehlich denied this entirely. Rather he stated that the end result of Justification for Abraham and us was not the declaration of “Righteousness” but the attainment of the covenant and its promises. In applying the Liberal Protestant tool of rational critique against the Protestant tradition itself, he concluded that the whole of it was seriously corrupted. His opinion of the established church of his day was that it merely upheld a collection of human innovations and manmade traditions while masquerading as the Church of Christ.

Froehlich was largely influenced by the Anabaptist tradition which had begun a few centuries prior in Europe, particularly by Menno Simons. In his abandonment of Protestant theology, he went even further than most Anabaptists to leave behind the medieval dogmas that had so shaped both the Roman Catholic and Protestant divide of Western Christianity. On some notable doctrines such as Original Sin, Atonement and the Sacraments, Froehlich represents a perspective that is far more in harmony with ancient Eastern Christianity. At a time when many Christians in the West were busily adapting the Enlightenment ideals of reason and progress to the Christian faith Froehlich called this effort into question.

His hermeneutic was based upon a simple, literal and historic reading of the Greek Old (Septuagint) and New Testament scriptures.

The Enlighteners, according to the new mode, consider the Bible the word of man, in which is contained much that is foolish, fabulous, fanatical and, to Enlightened reason, objectionable stuff...
-Evidence pg 46

Froehlich was often regarded as a fanatic in the tepid religious culture of 19th century Switzerland. He embraced the concept of mystery and refused to be content with either the liberal or conservative expressions of Christianity prevalent in his day. He saw both opinions as a reduction of Christianity into either mere inward sentimentality or a set of dry moral principles.

Reason will never grasp the mystery of Christ. Therefore, it speaks so foolishly about it. But faith does not ask why.
-Evidence pg 49

His opinions were well informed by the writings of the early Church Fathers and frequently referenced historic Christian practice as a guide. In apologetic writing, he often pitted the greater historical traditions of the Church against the accepted customs of his day.

An old church-father of the second century said that whatever testifies against the truth of the Word of God is heresy, though it were a custom ever so old and superannuated [well established]. 
-Evidence pg 27.

As a preacher, he could be considered a moralist along the lines of other reformers such as John Wesley, Menno Simons or John Chrysostom. He focused primarily on calling people to repentance, baptismal regeneration and an uncompromising pursuit of Jesus Christ and obedience to His word.

As with many of the Anabaptists who preceded him, Froehlich held a partially realized eschatology. That is to say he viewed his own time, as well as the times of Christian persecution before him, as part of the tribulation and conflict envisioned in St John's Revelation. He took a dissenting view of Christendom in his day and saw the way religion and politics cooperated as a manifestation of the Great Whore and the Beast described in Revelation chapter 17. This vision of cosmic conflict with the political and religious powers was fueled in no small way by the actual violence and coercion leveled against him and his followers. After being expelled from the state church, Froehlich was eventually banished from Switzerland and forced to leave behind his wife and family. During this separation his wife was fined because their marriage was not recognized by the established church. Many others in the movement were also fined for illegal assembly, imprisoned for proselytizing and persecuted for refusing to bear arms in the military. Only after years of forced separation was he reunited with his family when his wife was able to legally immigrate to Strasbourg and join him in exile.

Under such hard struggles the elect of God must show themselves fit for the inheritance of the saints, through the victory over the world; for they do not deal with a few but with the whole world and Christendom as Satan’s new kingdom… What the devil does in the heathen world in a crude way that he does in a more subtle manner in Christendom, and only a few notice that this door to hell is wider than the other.
-Observations on Revelation, pg 50

Works
An autobiography
Baptismal Truth
Two Mysteries
Matrimony
Evidence Demonstrating Truth on the Word of God
Meditations on Matthew
Meditations on Luke and John
Meditations on the Acts of the Apostles
Meditations on Romans and Corinthians
Meditations on Ephesians
Meditations on Philippians
Meditations on Hebrews
Meditations on the Epistles of John
Meditations on Revelation
Meditations on the Psalms
Meditations on Isaiah
Old Testament Meditations

References

External links
Fröhlich, Samuel Heinrich (1803-1857) at Global Anabaptist Mennonite Encyclopedia Online
Froehlich Library

1803 births
1857 deaths
Swiss Anabaptists
Swiss evangelicals
Evangelists
Anabaptism